In a credit card or debit card account, a dispute is a situation in which a customer questions the validity of a transaction that was registered to the account. Customers dispute charges for a variety of reasons, including unauthorized charges, excessive charges, failure by the merchant to deliver merchandise, defective merchandise, dissatisfaction with the product(s) or service(s) received, or billing errors.

In the United States, in the event of fraud, the cardholder is liable for a maximum of $50 worth of fraudulent charges. Many card issuers will waive this fee.

References

Credit card terminology